Encounters Of Every Kind is an album by Meco, released in 1978. It was recorded after the success of Meco's platinum-selling album Star Wars and Other Galactic Funk and contains two sides of linked songs. In contrast to the previous album (which dedicated a full side to the music from Star Wars) and contrary to an album title that suggests a similar focus on the music from Close Encounters of the Third Kind, this album is actually made up of songs from a number of different popular movies, with no special focus on any particular film. (Meco would return to this format for his 1982 album Pop Goes the Movies.) The music from Close Encounters only appears at the very end of the album.

Encounters of Every Kind was the last Meco album to gain significant prominence on the Billboard charts, though he continued to record film tie-ins with disco-inspired albums for The Wizard of Oz, Superman & Other Galactic Heroes (a tie-in with Superman, which was another John Williams score)  and ''Music From Star Trek & Music From The Black Hole (tie-ins with the 1979 films Star Trek: The Motion Picture and The Black Hole). None of these releases other than the Star Wars album have been released on CD, though some tracks from Close Encounters were available on the Best of Meco compact disc.

Track listing

Side one
"Time Machine" - (0:43)
"In the Beginning" (Harold Wheeler) - (3:27)
"Roman Nights" (Harold Wheeler) - (1:26)
"Lady Marion" (Harold Wheeler) - (2:52)
"Icebound" (Harold Wheeler) - (1:20)
"Hot in the Saddle" (Harold Wheeler) - (4:27)

Side two
"Time Machine" - (0:15)
"Crazy Rhythm" (Irving Caesar, Joseph Meyer, Roger Wolfe Kahn) - (3:49)
"Topsy" (Edgar Battle, Eddie Durham) - (3:33)
"Meco's Theme/3w.57" (Harold Wheeler) - (5:32)
"Theme from 'Close Encounters'" (John Williams) - (4:21)

Charts

Album

Singles

Credits
 Produced by Meco Monardo, Tony Bongiovi and Harold Wheeler 
 Mastered by George Marino
 Recorded at: 
 Celebration Studios, N.Y.C. 
 Power Station, New York City.
 Mastered at: Sterling Sound, N.Y.C.

References

External links
 Discogs link
 [ AMG link]

1977 albums
Casablanca Records albums
Meco albums
Albums produced by Tony Bongiovi
Albums produced by Harold Wheeler (musician)